Angela Stachowa (born Angela Mirtschink 16 August 1948 in Prague – 29 March 2022 in Leipzig ) was a German-Sorbian writer and politician .  She received the Domowina Art Prize, the City of Leipzig Art Prize (1986) the OIRT radio play prize , and the Johann Gottfried Herder Medal.

Life 
Angela Stachowa was the daughter of the Sorbian writer Jurij Měrćink . After graduating from high school in Bautzen in 1967 , she completed her studies at the Technical University of Dresden, where she graduated in 1972 with a degree in engineering economics specializing in electrical engineering/electronics. 

From 1973 to 1976 she was a research assistant at the Karl Marx University in Leipzig . She then worked as a freelance writer. Some of her works have been translated into Czech, Polish, Russian, Swedish, Croatian and English.

Angela Stachowa was a member of the SED from 1972 to 1989 . From 20 December 1990 to 10 November 1994 she was a member of the German Bundestag for one term . She was elected to parliament as an independent for the PDS /Left List via the Saxony state list . During the legislative period, she resigned from the PDS parliamentary group on 15 June 1994, but retained her mandate as an unalligned party.

Works 

 Stunde zwischen Hund & Katz. Mitteldeutscher Verlag, Halle 1975.
 Geschichten für Majka. Mitteldeutscher Verlag, Halle 1978.
 Annalinde und das Feuermännchen. VEB Domowina-Verlag, Bautzen 1981.
 Kleine Verführung. Mitteldeutscher Verlag, Halle 1982, . 
 Acht Tage Abschied. Postreiter, Halle 1987.
 Słónčna róža Marhata. Ludowe nakładnistwo Domowina (LND), Budyšin 1996.
 Lilow a knjez Handrik. LND, Budyšin 1997.
 Jank ze žołtym kłobukom. LND, Budyšin 2000.
 Vineta. LND, Budyšin 2002.

References 

1948 births
2022 deaths
People from Prague
20th-century German writers
20th-century German politicians
Sorbian people